Worldpay, Inc. was an American payment processing company and technology provider. In June 2019 it was acquired and merged into Fidelity National Information Services (FIS).  Before its acquisition, it was headquartered in the greater Cincinnati, Ohio area. Worldpay (formerly Vantiv), was the largest U.S. merchant acquirer ranked by general-purpose transaction volume.

The company provides payment and technology services to merchants and financial institutions in the U.S. and processes more than 20.1 billion payment transactions and approximately $726 billion in volume annually. As of 2014, the predecessor company, Vantiv, supported approximately 400,000 merchant locations and more than 17,000 automated teller machines (ATMs) in 46 states and eight countries.

The company's merchant base includes customers in vertical markets such as retail, restaurant, government, e-commerce, supermarket, drug store, business to business and consumer services. Its financial institution base includes diverse set of financial institutions, including regional banks, community banks, credit unions and regional personal identification number (PIN) debit networks.

The company adopted the name "Vantiv" in June 2011 as a step towards becoming a public company. Previously a joint venture between Advent International and Fifth Third Bancorp, Vantiv became a publicly traded company on March 22, 2012, listed on the NYSE under the ticker symbol "VNTV". It acquired London-based Worldpay Group plc and changed its name to Worldpay, Inc. on  January 16, 2018.

History 

In 1971, Fifth Third Bank formed Midwest Payment Systems (MPS) to provide Electronic Funds Transfer (EFT) services to financial institutions. In 1977, Jeanie, the nation's first shared online ATM network was developed and implemented. In 1991, MPS expanded to offer Merchant Services. In 2000, MPS acquired Integrated Delivery Technologies, Inc. (IDTI), Cartel Network and ACI Merchant Services.

In 2003, Midwest Payment Systems adopted the name Fifth Third Processing Solutions. In 2006, the company acquired Card Management Corporation (CMC) to provide a broader range of processing services. Several years later, in 2009, Fifth Third Processing Solutions spun off from Fifth Third Bancorp and was launched as a joint venture between Advent International and Fifth Third Bank, a subsidiary of Fifth Third Bancorp.

By the end of 2010, the company had acquired TNB Card Services, National Processing Company (NPC) and certain assets of Springbok Services, Inc. Prepaid Platform.  In June 2011, Fifth Third Processing Solutions assumed the Vantiv name.

Vantiv became a publicly traded company on March 22, 2012, listed on the NYSE under the ticker symbol "VNTV."

In December 2012, Vantiv acquired privately held Litle & Co. for $361 million. Litle develops e-commerce payment processing solutions that are used by companies that accept payments for goods and services online, via phone, and via mail. Vantiv said it would integrate Litle's technologies into its point-of-sale and e-commerce processing offerings.

In April 2013, Vantiv became the first U.S. acquirer to complete MasterCard's testing requirements to process EMV transactions for MasterCard, Maestro and Cirrus brands at both ATM and at the point-of-sale locations.

In July 2013, Vantiv announced an agreement to acquire privately held Element Payment Services. Element is a provider of fully integrated PCI DSS compliant payment processing solutions for merchants and business management software providers.

On May 12, 2014, Vantiv confirmed a $1.65 billion acquisition of Mercury Payment Systems LLC.

In November 2016, Vantiv acquired the US operations of Canadian payment processor Moneris Solutions.

In July 2017, the company announced its intention to acquire British-based Worldpay for $10.4 billion. Subsequent announcements have indicated that the combined entity will be named "Worldpay Inc." headquartered and listed in the United States, but internal operations will be based in the U.K. The transaction was completed on 16 January 2018.

On July 1, 2018, Worldpay Inc. acquired Pazien, a US payments data platform startup that Worldpay Group plc first invested in on May 14, 2014.

In March 2019, Fidelity National Information Services, Inc. (FIS), announced a $43 billion deal to buy Worldpay, reported as the biggest deal ever in the international payments sector.  The acquisition closed in June 2019 and Worldpay was merged into FIS. In February 2023, in the wake of pressure from activist investors, FIS announced it would spin off its merchant business that consisted of Worldpay in the next 12 months.

In November 2020, WorldPay expands into Argentina by securing domestic card scheme acquiring licenses in Argentina.

Financial institution relationships 

Worldpay works with financial institutions to develop programs and tools to simplify payment strategies.  The company's financial products include credit cards, ATM processing, merchant services, rewards and fraud prevention. Additionally, Worldpay assists financial institutions with pre-paid and gift cards, card personalization, debit PIN processing, cardholder eServices and more.

Worldpay provides payment strategies and technologies to over 1,400 financial institutions, including more than 700 credit unions throughout the U.S., supporting over 33 million debit cards and processing more than 15.7 billion transactions each year.

References

External links 

Companies formerly listed on the New York Stock Exchange
Financial services companies of the United States
Companies based in Cincinnati
Payment service providers
Merchant services
2012 initial public offerings
Financial technology companies
Financial services companies established in 1971
American companies established in 1971
2019 mergers and acquisitions
FIS (company)
American corporate subsidiaries